This is a list of Irish counties by their highest point. These are most commonly known as county high points but are also sometimes referred to as county tops and county peaks. There are 32 counties in Ireland, but in the case of 10 counties, marked with (‡), the highest point is shared between two counties, so there are only 27 distinct Irish county high points. The four Irish provincial tops, more also referred to as province high points, are also listed. The listings of Irish county high points under the definitions of Irish mountains (e.g. Furths, Marilyn, Arderins), are also provided.

The list of Irish county and provincial high points contains four of Ireland's five Real Munros, and 14 of Ireland's 25 P600 "Major" mountains.

Ireland's County High Points is one of 16 sub-lists which together comprise the complete list of 188 Irish major geographical high points.

Gallery

List

# = Rank Table
H = Height

See also
 List of Irish counties by area
 List of Irish counties by coastline
 Lists of mountains in Ireland

Notes

References

External links
High Point Ireland: Ireland's County High Points
High Point Ireland: Publisher of Irish High Points lists
MountainViews: The Irish Mountain Website
MountainViews: Irish Online Mountain Database
MountainView Online Database: Highest points by county in Ireland

Highest
Mountains
 
Irish counties